UNIFE, or the European Rail Supply Industry Association, is an association of Europe's rail supply companies active in the design, manufacture, maintenance and refurbishment of rail transport systems, subsystems and related equipment. UNIFE also brings together 15 national rail industry associations of European countries. UNIFE is a member of the Group of Representative Bodies.

UNIFE members have jointly an 84% market share in Europe and supply 46% of the worldwide production of rail equipment and services.

UNIFE advocates its members’ interests at both the European and International level—promoting EU rail equipment and standards within Europe and abroad. UNIFE and its members also work on the setting of interoperability standards and coordinate EU-funded research projects that aim at the technical harmonisation of railway systems. The association has developed IRIS (International Rail Industry Standard) – a sets of standards in rail transport which defines requirements in content, procedures and evaluation of audits as well as a requirement profile for the certification bodies and auditors. UNIFE is also the author of ERTMS.

UNIFE is also the administrator, jointly with CER, of the European Railway Award which honours outstanding political and technical achievements in the development of economically and environmentally sustainable rail transport.

References

External links
 

European trade associations
Railway associations
Transport industry associations
International organisations based in Belgium
International rail transport organizations
Transport organisations based in Belgium